Festigny may refer to the following places in France:

 Festigny, Marne, a commune in the Marne department
 Festigny, Yonne, a commune in the Yonne department